

Events
Cadenet wrote a sirventes criticising Raymond Roger Trencavel for his poor manners on a visit to Toulouse

Births
 Abû 'Uthmân Sa'îd ibn Hakam al Qurashi (died 1282), Arabic poet in Menorca

Deaths
 Fujiwara no Shunzei (born 1114), Japanese poet and nobleman

13th-century poetry
Poetry